Montgomery County is located in the southwestern portion of the U.S. state of Ohio. As of the 2020 census, the population was 537,309, making it the fifth-most populous county in Ohio. The county seat is Dayton. The county was named in honor of Richard Montgomery, an American Revolutionary War general killed in 1775 while attempting to capture Quebec City, Canada. Montgomery County is part of the Dayton, Ohio Metropolitan Statistical Area.

Geography

Adjacent counties
 Miami County (north)
 Clark County (northeast)
 Greene County (east)
 Warren County (south)
 Butler County (southwest)
 Preble County (west)
 Darke County (northwest)

Major highways

  Interstate 70
  Interstate 70 Alternate
  Interstate 75
  Interstate 675
  U.S. Route 25
  U.S. Route 35
  U.S. Route 40
  State Route 4
  State Route 48
  State Route 49
  State Route 123
  State Route 201
  State Route 202
  State Route 235
  State Route 444
  State Route 725
  State Route 741
  State Route 835

National protected area
 Dayton Aviation Heritage National Historical Park (part)

Demographics

2000 census
As of the census of 2000, there were 559,062 people, 229,229 households, and 146,935 families living in the county. The population density was 1,211 people per square mile (468/km2). There were 248,443 housing units at an average density of 538 per square mile (208/km2). The racial makeup of the county was 76.57% White, 19.86% Black or African American, 0.23% Native American, 1.31% Asian, 0.04% Pacific Islander, 0.49% from other races, and 1.51% from two or more races. 1.27% of the population were Hispanic or Latino of any race.

There were 229,229 households, out of which 29.60% had children under the age of 18 living with them, 46.30% were married couples living together, 13.80% had a female householder with no husband present, and 35.90% were non-families. 30.40% of all households were made up of individuals, and 10.10% had someone living alone who was 65 years of age or older. The average household size was 2.37, and the average family size was 2.96.

In the county, the population was spread out, with 24.70% under the age of 18, 9.70% from 18 to 24, 29.00% from 25 to 44, 22.90% from 45 to 64, and 13.70% who were 65 years of age or older. The median age was 36 years. For every 100 females, there were 92.30 males. For every 100 females age 18 and over, there were 88.60 males.

The median income for a household in the county was $40,156, and the median income for a family was $50,071. Males had a median income of $38,710 versus $27,297 for females. The per capita income for the county was $21,743. About 8.30% of families and 11.30% of the population were below the poverty line, including 15.60% of those under age 18 and 8.20% of those age 65 or over.

2010 census
As of the 2010 census, there were 535,153 people, 223,943 households, and 138,060 families living in the county. The racial makeup of the county was 73.9% white, 20.9% black or African American, 1.7% Asian, 0.2% American Indian, 0.8% from other races, and 2.4% from two or more races. Those of Hispanic or Latino origin made up 2.3% of the population. In terms of ancestry, 24.9% were German, 12.8% were Irish, 9.7% were American, and 8.8% were English.

Of the 223,943 households, 29.7% had children under the age of 18 living with them, 41.6% were married couples living together, 15.3% had a female householder with no husband present, 38.4% were non-families, and 32.2% of all households were made up of individuals. The average household size was 2.33, and the average family size was 2.94. The median age was 39.2 years.

The median income for a household in the county was $43,965, and the median income for a family was $56,559. Males had a median income of $45,680 versus $34,991 for females. The per capita income for the county was $24,828. About 11.7% of families and 15.7% of the population were below the poverty line, including 22.7% of those under age 18 and 8.7% of those aged 65 or over.

Government

Current officials
 Board of Commissioners:
 Judy Dodge (D)
 Debbie Lieberman (D)
 Carolyn Rice (D)
 County Auditor: Karl L. Keith (D)
 Clerk of Courts: Mike Foley (R)
 County Coroner: Dr. Kent Harshbarger
 County Engineer: Paul Gruner (D)
 County Prosecutor: Mathias H. Heck Jr. (D)
 County Recorder: Brandon McClain (D)
 Sheriff: Rob Streck (R)
 County Treasurer: John McManus (R)

See also:
 Election Results, Montgomery County, Ohio

Politics
In the six presidential elections until 2016, Montgomery County has favored the Democratic candidate, but not by large margins. However, in 2016, Republican Donald Trump narrowly defeated Democrat Hillary Clinton. Montgomery County was also the most populated county in Ohio to vote for Trump in 2016, and it was the only county in Ohio to flip for Joe Biden in 2020.

|}

Education

Post-secondary institutions

Public
 Air Force Institute of Technology (actually located in  Wright-Patterson AFB, Ohio).
 Sinclair Community College
 Wright State University (actually located in neighboring Greene County, Ohio, but uses a Dayton address).

Private
 University of Dayton
 Kettering College of Medical Arts
 The Miami Valley School

Public schools
The following public school districts are located partially or entirely in Montgomery County:
 Local School Districts
 Brookville Local Schools
 Brookville High School, Brookville (the Blue Devils)
 Carlisle Local School District
 Carlisle High School, Carlisle (the Indians)
 Jefferson Township Local Schools
 Jefferson Township High School, Dayton (the Broncos)
 Mad River Local School District
 New Lebanon Local Schools
 Dixie High School, Dixie (the Greyhounds)
 Northmont City School District
 Northridge Local School District
 Northridge High School (the Polar Bears)
 Mad River Local Schools
 Walter E. Stebbins High School, Riverside (the Indians)
 Preble Shawnee Local School District
 Tri-County North Local School District
 Valley View Local Schools
 Valley View High School, Germantown (the Spartans)

 City School Districts
 Beavercreek City School District
 Centerville City Schools
 Centerville High School, Centerville (the Elks)
 Dayton Public Schools
 Belmont High School for Computer Technology/Engineering, Dayton (the Bison)
 Thurgood Marshall High School for the Arts, Dayton (the Cougars)
 Dayton Early College Academy, Dayton
 Dunbar High School for Professional Studies, Dayton (the Wolverines)
 Meadowdale High School for Cultural Studies/International Baccalaureate, Dayton (the Lions)
 Stivers School for the Arts, Dayton (Tigers)
 Fairborn City School District
 Huber Heights City Schools
 Wayne High School, Huber Heights (the Warriors)
 Kettering City School District
 Fairmont High School, Kettering (the Firebirds)
 (merger of the former Fairmont East and Fairmont West high schools (the East Falcons and the West Dragons)
 Miamisburg City Schools
 Miamisburg High School, Miamisburg (the Vikings)
 Northmont City Schools
 Northmont High School, Clayton (the Thunderbolts)
 Oakwood City School District
 Oakwood High School, Oakwood (the Lumberjacks)
 Springboro Community City School District
 Trotwood-Madison City Schools
 Trotwood-Madison High School, Trotwood (the Rams)
 Vandalia Butler City Schools
 Butler High School, Vandalia (the Aviators)
 West Carrollton Schools
 West Carrollton Senior High School, West Carrollton (the Pirates)

There is also a public independent (not a part of any school district) STEM school:
 The Dayton Regional STEM School

Private schools
The following private high schools are located in Montgomery County:
 Archbishop Alter High School, Kettering (the Knights) (Roman Catholic)
 Carroll High School, Dayton (the Patriots) (Roman Catholic)
 Chaminade Julienne High School, Dayton (Eagles) (Roman Catholic/Marianist)
 Dayton Christian High School, Dayton (the Warriors) (nondenominational Christian)
 Miami Valley School, Dayton (the Rams) (nonsectarian)
 Spring Valley Academy, Centerville (Seventh-day Adventist)

Communities

Cities

 Brookville
 Carlisle (mostly in Warren County)
 Centerville (partly in Greene County)
 Clayton
 Dayton (county seat)
 Englewood
 Germantown
 Huber Heights (partly in Miami County)
 Kettering (partly in Greene County)
 Miamisburg
 Moraine
 Oakwood
 Riverside
 Springboro (mostly in Warren County)
 Trotwood
 Union (mostly in Montgomery County)
 Vandalia
 West Carrollton

Villages
 Farmersville
 New Lebanon
 Phillipsburg
 Verona (mostly in Preble County)

Townships

 Butler
 Clay
 German
 Harrison
 Jackson
 Jefferson
 Miami
 Perry
 Washington

https://web.archive.org/web/20160715023447/http://www.ohiotownships.org/township-websites

Defunct townships
 Dayton
 Mad River (remnant merged with the Village of Riverside in 1994)
 Madison (remnant merged with the Village of Trotwood in 1996)
 Randolph (remnant merged with the Village of Clayton in 1998)
 Van Buren (partitioned between the municipalities of Kettering and Moraine in 1952–1953)
 Wayne (incorporated as Huber Heights in 1981)

Census-designated place
 Drexel

Unincorporated communities

 Airhill
 Amity
 Arlington
 Bachman
 Chautauqua
 Dodson
 Fort McKinley
 Harries
 Kinsey
 Liberty
 Little York
 Miami Villa
 Morgan Place
 New Chicago
 Northridge
 Pyrmont
 Shiloh
 Spanker
 Taylorsburg
 Woodbourne-Hyde Park

See also
 National Register of Historic Places listings in Montgomery County, Ohio

References

External links
 Montgomery County Government's website
 Montgomery County Public Records Online

 
1803 establishments in Ohio
Populated places established in 1803
World War II Heritage Cities